13 Hours: The Secret Soldiers of Benghazi (also known simply as 13 Hours) is a 2016 American biographical action-thriller film directed and produced by Michael Bay and written by Chuck Hogan; based on Mitchell Zuckoff's 2014 book of the same name. The film follows six members of the Annex Security Team who fought to defend the American diplomatic compound in Benghazi, Libya after waves of attacks by militants on September 11, 2012. The film stars James Badge Dale, John Krasinski, Pablo Schreiber, Max Martini, David Denman and Dominic Fumusa, with supporting roles by Toby Stephens, Alexia Barlier and David Costabile.

Filming began on April 27, 2015, in Malta and Morocco. Known colloquially as "the Benghazi movie," the film was released on January 15, 2016, by Paramount Pictures. Upon release, 13 Hours grossed $69 million worldwide against a production budget of $50 million (not including advertising and distribution), and became one of Bay's lowest-grossing films until the 2022 release of Ambulance. 13 Hours also received many mixed reviews from critics. While the film was praised for its acting performances, action sequences, and dark tone, the script was criticized for its historical liberties. Bay's direction also received a mixed response, with many criticizing his emphasis on over-the-top action, but some also noting it as one of his most mature and grounded films.

The film received an Oscar nomination for Best Sound Mixing at the 89th Academy Awards.

Plot 

In 2012, following the overthrow of Muammar Gaddafi, Benghazi in Libya is named one of the most dangerous places in the world, and countries have pulled their diplomatic offices out of the country in fear of an attack by militants. The United States still has a diplomatic compound, not an official consulate, open in the city. Less than a mile away is a top secret CIA base, "the Annex," which is protected by a team of private military contractors from Global Response Staff (GRS). New to the detail is former US Navy SEAL Jack Silva, who arrives in Benghazi and is picked up by fellow former US Navy SEAL Tyrone "Rone" Woods, the commander of the GRS team and a personal friend of Silva. Arriving at the Annex, Silva is introduced to the rest of the GRS team: former US Marines Mark "Oz" Geist, John "Tig" Tiegen and Dave "Boon" Benton and former US Army Ranger Kris "Tanto" Paronto and the CIA Chief of Station, "Bob", who constantly gives the team strict reminders to never engage the citizens.

Prior to the US Ambassador's arrival, the GRS team members visit the Special Mission, where the Ambassador will be staying. They review the location and warn Diplomatic Security Service (DSS) Agents Scott Wickland and Dave Ubben about the risk of minimal-security arrangements and the high probability of a surprise attack due to the weak central government. US Ambassador Chris Stevens arrives in Benghazi to maintain diplomatic connections amid the political and social chaos, with limited protection from five DSS Agents, principally Wickland and Ubben, along with guards hired from the local February 17th Martyrs Brigade militia, nicknamed "17-Feb." On the morning of the eleventh anniversary of the September 11 attacks, Stevens notices suspicious men taking pictures of the compound and notifies his security detail. Back at the Annex, Silva finds out that his wife is pregnant.

That night, a group of militants from Ansar al-Sharia assault the compound. The 17-Feb guards are quickly overrun, which allows the attackers easy access to the compound. Wickland takes Stevens and Smith, an IT specialist, to the safe room. Unable to breach the safe room, the attackers set the building on fire hoping to burn the men out. Wickland escapes but loses both Stevens and Smith. At the Annex, the GRS team desperately wants to go to the compound to help, but the Chief refuses for fear that the team's departure would expose the Annex. However, the team dispatches to the compound anyway and meets up with the DSS Agents, with the team splitting up: Silva, Woods, and Tiegen head to the consulate, while Paronto and Benton head to the back gate, assisted by a few 17-Feb militants. Silva and Woods enter the building searching for Stevens and Smith but find only Smith's body. After an intense firefight inside the compound against the militants, the DSS team retreats in a car, but after a beat-up Wickland goes the wrong way, they are followed by militants on their way back to the Annex. Later, the GRS team also retreats to the Annex.

Knowing that an attack by the militants is imminent, the CIA staff of the Annex makes several desperate calls for help, but only former US Navy SEAL Glen "Bub" Doherty, a GRS operator in Tripoli, helps. He forms a team, including two Delta Force operators, that flies to Benghazi after several delays. Meanwhile, the GRS team fends off the militants as they try to breach the Annex perimeter. After repelling the largest attack wave, the Annex receives word from ISR that help is coming.

The Tripoli GRS reinforcements arrive and begin to prepare the CIA and DSS staff for their departure to the airport. The militants launch a mortar attack in which Ubben and Geist are wounded, and Geist's left arm is partially severed. Woods rushes to aid Geist and is killed by another mortar round. Doherty is also killed when a third mortar detonates directly in front of him.

While a wounded Geist and Ubben are being tended to, Delta Force operatives dispose of Woods' body, angering Silva. With the GRS team compromised and the Annex now vulnerable, the remaining GRS operators watch as a convoy of vehicles rolls toward the Annex. Fearing the worst, the operators prepare to make a final stand until it is revealed that the convoy is an element of the Libya Shield Force militia that is escorting the GRS reinforcements. They also find out that Stevens had been found behind the compound but was pronounced dead at the hospital.

At the airport, the CIA staff and the wounded Geist board the plane to Tripoli while the remainder of the GRS team waits for the next plane with the bodies of Stevens, Smith, Woods, and Doherty. Paronto is approached by his 17-Feb allies and gives them some keys to Gaddafi's old armored vehicles. Meanwhile, Silva speaks with his wife and tells her that he is finally coming home; however, he tearfully admits that Woods didn't make it and isn't coming home. Shortly after, he briefly recalls a conversation with Woods they had at the annex and zips his bodybag up. Closing titles reveal that all of the surviving members of the Annex security GRS team received contractor medals at a private ceremony, have since retired from the GRS team, and live with their families and that Geist was able to save his arm after several surgeries after re-enlisting.

Cast

GRS Team 
 John Krasinski as Jack Silva, newest member of the team and former US Navy SEAL
 James Badge Dale as Tyrone S. "Rone" Woods, commander of the GRS team and former US Navy SEAL
 Max Martini as Mark "Oz" Geist, team member and former US Marine
 Dominic Fumusa as John "Tig" Tiegen, team member and former US Marine
 Pablo Schreiber as Kris "Tanto" Paronto, team member and former US Army Ranger
 David Denman as Dave "Boon" Benton, team member and former US Marine Scout Sniper
 Toby Stephens as Glen "Bub" Doherty, GRS operator in Tripoli, former US Navy SEAL, and good friend of Woods and Silva

CIA 

 Alexia Barlier as Sona Jillani, an undercover CIA Officer in Libya
 Freddie Stroma as Brit Vayner, an undercover CIA Officer in Libya
 David Costabile as "Bob" aka. "The Chief", the Benghazi CIA Chief-of-Station
 Shane Rowe as CIA Annex Cook, who participates in the defense of the Annex
 Gábor Bodis as CIA Agent, a security officer

U.S. State Department 

 Matt Letscher as J. Christopher Stevens, US Ambassador to Libya
 David Giuntoli as Scott Wickland, DSS Agent
 Demetrius Grosse as Dave Ubben, DSS Agent
 David Furr as Alec Henderson, DSS Agent
 Davide Tucci as Defense Attaché
 Christopher Dingli as Sean Smith, an IT specialist

Civilians 
 Wrenn Schmidt as Becky Silva, wife of Jack Silva
 Peyman Moaadi as Amahl, a local interpreter

Production

Development 
On February 10, 2014, it was announced that Paramount Pictures was in talks with 3 Arts Entertainment to acquire the film rights to the book 13 Hours, written by Mitchell Zuckoff, with Erwin Stoff to produce. Chuck Hogan was set to adapt the book, based on the true events of the Benghazi attack by militants on the American diplomatic compound in Benghazi, Libya, on the evening of September 11, 2012. The film would focus on six members of a security team that fought to defend the Americans stationed there. On October 29, 2014, Michael Bay was set to direct and produce the thriller.

Casting 
On January 14, 2015, John Krasinski was cast in the film, to play one of the lead roles, a former US Navy SEAL. On February 3, Pablo Schreiber also signed on to star in the film, playing Kris "Tanto" Paronto, one of the six-man security team. On February 6, James Badge Dale was set to star, as the leader of the security team. Max Martini was cast as another member of the security team on February 17, 2015. David Denman signed on to star in the film on March 3, 2015, playing Boon, an elite sniper. On March 5, 2015, THR reported that Dominic Fumusa also signed on, to play John "Tig" Tiegen, one of the members of the security team, who is also a former Marine with weapons expertise. Freddie Stroma was added to the cast on March 17, 2015, to play the role of an undercover CIA officer in Libya. On May 7, 2015, Toby Stephens was set to play Glen "Bub" Doherty, another of the security team members.

Filming 
Principal photography began on April 27, 2015, in Malta and Morocco.

Release 
On June 30, 2015, Paramount announced that the new title would be 13 Hours: The Secret Soldiers of Benghazi, and set the film to be released on January 15, 2016, on the MLK Holiday weekend. The film premiered on January 12, 2016, at the AT&T Stadium in Arlington, Texas, benefiting the Shadow Warriors Project, which supports private military security personnel and other groups.

Unusual for a major American film, the film was given only a limited release in Canada during its American wide opening weekend, playing in select theatres in Toronto, Montreal, Vancouver, Edmonton, Calgary and Ottawa. The film expanded to a wide release in Canadian theatres the following weekend, January 22–24.

Paramount specifically marketed the film to conservatives, in a method similar to previous films Lone Survivor and American Sniper, both of which had beaten box office expectations. This included screening the film for key Republican Party figures in order to generate endorsement quotations.

Home media 
13 Hours: The Secret Soldiers of Benghazi was released on DVD and Blu-ray on June 7, 2016. Likely due to a boost from the 2016 U.S. Presidential Election, the film made $40 million in DVD and Blu-ray sales by August 2016.

13 Hours: The Secret Soldiers of Benghazi was released on 4K UHD Blu-Ray on June 11, 2019.

Reception

Box office 
13 Hours grossed $52.9 million in North America and $16.5 million in other territories for a worldwide total of $69.4 million, against a production budget of $50 million, making it Michael Bay's lowest-grossing directorial film to-date.

The film was projected to earn around $20 million in its four-day Martin Luther King weekend debut. It faced competition from fellow newcomer Ride Along 2, as well as holdovers The Revenant and Star Wars: The Force Awakens. Other films in a similar vein that had opened on the MLK weekend in previous years, American Sniper ($107.2 million in 2015) and Lone Survivor ($37.8 million in 2014), found success, although they had faced weaker competition, and were considered less politically divisive. However, The Hollywood Reporter noted that the film could outperform expectations if it was buoyed by waves of patriotism. The film made $900,000 from 1,995 theaters during its Thursday previews and $16.2 million in its opening weekend, finishing fourth at the box office. The film added 528 theaters in its second weekend and grossed $9 million, a 39.8% drop.

Critical response 
13 Hours received mixed reviews from critics, though some viewed it as a welcomed tame effort from Michael Bay. On review aggregator Rotten Tomatoes, the film has an approval rating of 51% based on 222 reviews, with an average rating of 5.60/10. The site's consensus reads, "13 Hours: The Secret Soldiers of Benghazi is a comparatively mature and restrained effort from Michael Bay, albeit one that can't quite boast the impact its fact-based story deserves." On Metacritic the film has a score of 48 out of 100, based on 36 critics, indicating "mixed or average reviews". Audiences polled by CinemaScore gave the film an average grade of "A" on an A+ to F scale.

Soren Andersen, writing for The Seattle Times, gave the film 3 stars out of 4, criticizing the lack of distinctive characters but ultimately summarizing 13 Hours as "engrossing" and "a ground-level depiction of heroism in the midst of the fog of war". Richard Roeper similarly praised 13 Hours in his review for the Chicago Sun-Times. Although he lamented the script, Roeper found the film to be a "solid action thriller with well-choreographed battle sequences and strong work from the ensemble cast". Like Roeper's review, New York Daily News Joe Dziemianowicz was less receptive toward the script, but applauded the film's focus on the real-life attack, summarizing: "War is gritty here, not glamorous... [Michael Bay] delivers a gripping, harrowing, and heartfelt film."

In a mixed review, Inkoo Kang of TheWrap praised 13 Hours for its action scenes, but panned Bay's direction as "myopic". She writes, "13 Hours is the rare Michael Bay movie that wasn't made with teenage boys in mind. But that doesn't make his latest any less callously juvenile." Lindsey Bahr of the Associated Press was critical of the film's direction and cinematography, and found the screenplay to be confusing. Similarly, The Economist described the film as "a sleek, poorly scripted and largely meaningless film".

Libyan response 
The film caused controversy in Libya.  Many Libyans believed it ignored the contributions of local people who attempted to save the US ambassador. Libya's Foreign Ministry spokesman, Salah Belnaba, denounced the film's portrayal of the Libyan people and described it as "fanatical and ignorant." Culture and Information Minister, Omar Gawaari, also criticized the film saying: "the movie shows the US contractors who actually failed to secure the ambassador [...] as heroes", adding that Michael Bay "turned America's failure to protect its own citizens in a fragile state into a typical action movie all about American heroism".

Accolades 
At the 89th Academy Awards, 13 Hours received a nomination for Best Sound Mixing. However, Greg P. Russell (one of the four nominees from the film) had his nomination rescinded when it was discovered that he had contacted voters for the award by telephone in violation of campaigning regulations.

Historical accuracy 
The film's historical accuracy has been disputed. In the film's most controversial scene, the CIA chief in Benghazi (identified only as "Bob") tells the military contractors there when they seek permission to go defend the embassy to "stand down" and thus denies them permission. The real-life CIA chief stated that there was no stand-down order, but multiple sources who were willing to identify themselves have refuted the still-unnamed CIA chief. However, no help was sent even though officials at the highest levels had found out about the attack within the first few hours out of the 13. Also, the National Review commentator David French argues that the Senate committee cited above found plenty of evidence of the "stand down" order in the form of personal testimony from multiple witnesses but chose to rule that the contrary testimony outweighed it.

Kris "Tanto" Paronto, a CIA contractor who was involved in action during the event, said, "We were told to 'stand down'. Those words were used verbatim—100 percent. If the truth of it affects someone's political career? Well, I'm sorry. It happens." The CIA base chief portrayed in the film has directly contradicted Paronto's claims, saying "There never was a stand-down order.... At no time did I ever second-guess that the team would depart."

Also disputed is the film's portrayal that air support was denied. A House Armed Services Committee report found that air support was unavailable or that it would have arrived too late to make a difference.

See also 

 2012 Benghazi attack
 Counterterrorism Center
 List of films featuring the United States Navy SEALs

References

External links 

 
 
 
 
 
  (rating 3/5)
 13 Hours: The Secret Soldiers of Benghazi at History vs. Hollywood

2016 films
2016 action drama films
2010s English-language films
2010s war films
2012 Benghazi attack
3 Arts Entertainment films
Action films based on actual events
American action drama films
American films based on actual events
American war films
Films about the Central Intelligence Agency
Films about Delta Force
Films about terrorism in Africa
Films about United States Navy SEALs
Films based on non-fiction books
Films directed by Michael Bay
Films produced by Michael Bay
Films scored by Lorne Balfe
Films set in 2012
Films set in Libya
Films shot in Malta
Films shot in Morocco
Paramount Pictures films
Thriller films based on actual events
War films based on actual events
2010s American films